2016 in television may refer to
 2016 in American television for television related events in the United States.
 2016 in Australian television for television related events in Australia.
 2016 in Belgian television for television related events in Belgium.
 2016 in Brazilian television for television related events in Brazil.
 2016 in British television for television related events in Great Britain.
 2016 in Scottish television for television related events in Scotland.
 2016 in Canadian television for television related events in Canada.
 2016 in Croatian television for television related events in Croatia.
 2016 in Danish television for television related events in Denmark.
 2016 in Dutch television for television related events in the Netherlands.
 2016 in Estonian television for television related events in Estonia.
 2016 in French television for television related events in France.
 2016 in German television for television related events in Germany.
 2016 in Indian television for television related events in India.
 2016 in Irish television for television related events in Ireland.
 2016 in Italian television for television related events in Italy.
 2016 in Japanese television for television related events in Japan.
 2016 in Mexican television for television related events in Mexico.
 2016 in Norwegian television for television related events in Norway.
 2016 in Pakistani television for television related events in Pakistan.
 2016 in Philippine television for television related events in the Philippines.
 2016 in Polish television for television related events in Poland.
 2016 in Portuguese television for television related events in Portugal.
 2016 in South African television for television related events in South Africa.
 2016 in South Korean television for television related events in South Korea.
 2016 in Spanish television for television related events in Spain.
 2016 in Swedish television for television related events in Sweden.
 2016 in Turkish television for television related events in Turkey.

 
Mass media timelines by year